The 80th Texas Legislature met in regular session beginning 9 January 2007. All members of the House of Representatives and 16 members of the Senate were up for election on 7 November 2006 in the Texas Legislature election.

The 80th Texas Legislature convened in Regular Session on 9 January 2007. The Legislature adjourned on 28 May 2007.

Party summary

Senate

House of Representatives

At the beginning of the regular session, the Republican Party held an 80–69 advantage with one vacancy that was filled by the GOP, creating an 81–69 Republican majority (reflected above). After the Regular Session, one Representative left the GOP and joined the Democratic Party and another Republican resigned and was replaced by a Democrat in a special election, making the tally 79–71. In February, one Democrat resigned, whose vacancy was filled by another Democrat, restoring the 79–71 tally before a GOP member of the House died, bringing the final composition to 78–71 with one vacancy.

Officers

Senate
 Lieutenant Governor: David Dewhurst, Republican
 President Pro Tempore:
Regular Session: Mario Gallegos, Democrat
Ad Interim: John Carona, Republican

House of Representatives
 Speaker of the House: Tom Craddick, Republican

Members

Senate

House of Representatives

: The incumbent, Republican Glenda Dawson, died before the election but after she could be replaced on the ballot. She won the November election, and was replaced by Mike O'Day (R-Pearland), elected on January 16, 2007 in a special election run-off.  He was sworn into office on January 25, 2007. 

: State Rep. Kirk England of Grand Prairie served as a Republican during the regular session, but joined the Democratic Party on September 19, 2007. 

: State Rep. Anna Mowrey, a Republican, resigned and was replaced in a special election by Dan Barrett, a Democrat elected on December 18, 2007 

: State Rep. Robert Puente (D-San Antonio) resigned on February 1, 2008.

2008 Elections

Incumbents retiring or seeking other offices
 Rep. Robert Cook (D-Eagle Lake)
 Rep. Mike O'Day (R-Pearland)
 Rep. Mike Krusee (R-Austin)
 Rep. Dianne White Delisi (R-Temple)
 Rep. Rick Noriega (D-Houston), ran for U.S. Senate

Incumbents defeated in primary
 Rep. Paul Moreno (D-El Paso)
 Rep. Juan Manuel Escobar (D-Kingsville)
 Rep. Corbin Van Arsdale (R-Houston)
 Rep. Kevin Bailey (D-Houston)
 Rep. Borris Miles (D-Houston)

External links

80 Texas Legislature
2007 U.S. legislative sessions
2008 U.S. legislative sessions
2007 in Texas